Admiral Small may refer to:

Douglas W. Small (born 1965), U.S. Navy rear admiral
Ernest G. Small (1888–1944), U.S. Navy rear admiral
William N. Small (1927–2016), U.S. Navy admiral